Joule Unlimited, formerly known as Joule Biotechnologies, was a producer of alternative energy technologies based in Bedford, Massachusetts. The company developed a process to generate hydrocarbon-based fuel by combining non-fresh water, nutrients, cyanobacteria, carbon dioxide, and sunlight.  After ten years of operation and building a demonstration plant in New Mexico, the company shut down in August 2017. The company shut down after management was unable to raise money.

Technology claims

The company claimed it would be able to produce more than 20,000 gallons of fuel per acre per year (19,000 m3/km2/annum) in almost refined form using carbon dioxide waste from industrial processes and desert land.

Helioculture uses photosynthetic organisms, but is otherwise distinct from the process that makes fuel from algae. Oils made from algae usually have to be refined into fuel following a batch process, but helioculture secretes fuel directly rather than storing it in their cells - either ethanol or hydrocarbons - that do not need refining.  The helioculture process also does not produce biomass.  This process is enabled by the discovery of unique genes coding for enzymatic mechanisms that enable the direct synthesis of such  key molecules as alkanes, olefins, ethanol and polymers and other high-value chemicals ordinarily derived from petroleum, using bacterial variants. Helioculture allows for brackish water or graywater, nonindustrial waste water from sources such as baths and washing machines, to be used, while traditional biofuels such as cellulosic ethanol require fresh water.

Joule Unlimited claimed that its product would have been cost competitive with crude oil at $50 a barrel ($310/m3). The company also stated that its product could supply all of the transportation fuel for the United States from an area the size of the Texas panhandle.

Joule Unlimited did not reveal the name of the organism that it used, although it acknowledged that the company had modified the organism.  In September, 2010, Joule received a patent for genetically altered bacterium.

People
Joule Unlimited was founded in 2007 within Flagship VentureLabs by Noubar Afeyan and David Berry. In addition to its founders, Joule's Board of Directors included Graham Allison, Anatoly Chubais, Stelios Papadopoulos, Caroline Dorsa, and Ruben Vardanian.  Joule's Scientific Advisory Board includes synthetic biologists George M. Church and Jim Collins.

Audi partnership
After building a demonstration plant in New Mexico, Joule Unlimited entered into a strategic partnership with Audi in 2012 to accelerate the commercialization of their fuels, ethanol named Sunflow-E and diesel named Sunflow-D. Audi brands them as e-ethanol and e-diesel respectively.

References

External links

Official Web page of Joule Biotechnologies
Joule Biotechnologies Unveils Liquid Fuel From Solar Power, Wall St. Journal, July 27, 2009
Joule Biotechnologies announce new biofuel jargon, scant details, Scientific American, July 27, 2009
A Cagey Bet On Clean Tech, Forbes, July 27, 2009
Patents assigned to Joule Unlimited
 US 7785861 ("Hyperphotosynthetic organisms", 2010-08-31)
 US 7794969 ("Methods and compositions for the recombinant biosynthesis of n-alkanes", 2010-09-14)
Patent applications (Joule Unlimited personnel)
 WO 2010 062707 A1 ("Methods and compositions for producing carbon-based products of interest in micro-organisms", 2010-06-03)
 WO 2010 036951 A3R4 ("Methods and compositions for producing carbon-based products of interest in micro-organisms", 2010-06-24)
 WO 2010 068288 A3R4 ("Solar biofactory, photobioreactors, passive thermal regulation systems and methods for producing products", 2010-10-07)
 WO 2010 017245 A8R5 ("Methods and compositions for producing carbon-based products of interest in micro-organisms", 2010-10-14)
 Synpcc7942_1594 — acyl-ACP reductase (Synechococcus elongatus PCC 7942) (see US 7794969)
 "Microbial biosynthesis of alkanes", Schirmer A, Rude MA, Li X, Popova E, del Cardayre SB, Science 2010 Jul 30;329(5991):559-62.

Sustainable energy
Algae biomass producers
Companies based in Bedford, Massachusetts